KCER-LP (105.9 FM) was a radio station licensed to Cisco, Texas, United States. The station was owned by Aliyat Communications.

Aliyat Communications surrendered KCER-LP's license to the Federal Communications Commission on April 26, 2021, and the license was cancelled the same day.

References

External links
 

CER-LP
CER-LP
Radio stations established in 2004
2004 establishments in Texas
Radio stations disestablished in 2021
2021 disestablishments in Texas
Defunct radio stations in the United States
Defunct religious radio stations in the United States
CER-LP